Edwin Atwater (September 14, 1808 in Williston, Vermont – June 18, 1874 in Montreal) was a Canadian businessman, corporate director and municipal politician in Montreal.

Atwater immigrated to Lower Canada in 1830 settling in Montreal. He served on Montreal's city council as councillor (1850–51) and later as alderman (1852–57) for the district of Saint-Antoine. As a municipal politician, he promoted the construction of Canal de l'Aqueduc, an aqueduct in Montreal. He also served as president of the Montreal Board of Trade in 1861.

He served on the board of directors of the Montreal City and District Savings Bank (later known as Laurentian Bank of Canada), Montreal Telegraph Company, Merchants’ Bank and Citizens’ Insurance Company of Canada.

He married Lucy Huntington Greene (April 15, 1814 – May 29, 1890). They had four sons and four daughters.

The City of Montreal named Atwater Street after him in 1871, and the following Montreal landmarks are named after the avenue:
Atwater Metro Station
Atwater Library and Computer Centre, operated by the Mechanics' Institute of Montreal.
Atwater Market

References

External links 
Biography at the Dictionary of Canadian Biography Online
 Photograph: Edwin Atwater, wife Lucy H. G. & daughter Maria, about 1845. McCord Museum
Long Island Genealogy: Edwin Atwater, b. 1814 
Vieux-Montréal: Edwin Atwater
Photograph: Edwin Atwater, 1862. McCord Museum

1808 births
1874 deaths
People from Williston, Vermont
Pre-Confederation Canadian businesspeople
Businesspeople from Montreal
Atwater. Edwin
Atwater. Edwin
American emigrants to pre-Confederation Quebec
Anglophone Quebec people
Immigrants to Lower Canada